The 2022–23 Women's EHF Champions League knockout stage will begin on 18 March with the playoffs and end on 4 June 2023 with the final at the MVM Dome in Budapest, Hungary, to decide the winners of the 2022–23 Women's EHF Champions League. A total of twelve teams will compete in the knockout phase.

Format
In the playoffs, the eight teams ranked 2nd–6th in Groups A and B play against each other in two-legged home-and-away matches. The four winning teams advance to the quarterfinals, where they are joined by the top-two teams of Groups A and B for another round of two-legged home-and-away matches. The four quarterfinal winners qualify for the final four tournament at the MVM Dome in Budapest, Hungary.

Qualified teams
The top six teams from Groups A and B qualified for the knockout stage.

All times are UTC+2 (matches on 18, 19 and 25 March are UTC+1).

Playoffs

Overview

|}

Matches

Quarterfinals

Overview

|}

Matches

Final four
The final four will be held at the MVM Dome in Budapest, Hungary on 3 and 4 June 2023.

Bracket

Semifinals

Third place game

Final

References

External links
Official website

knockout stage